Electrocutionist (February 24, 2001 - September 9, 2006) was a Thoroughbred racehorse. Electrocutionist won eight of his 12 career starts, including three Grade I's, and won more than $5.6 million.  Racing four times for the operation based in both Dubai and Newmarket, he was scheduled to participate in the Emirates Airline Champion Stakes (Eng-I) at Newmarket on Oct. 14, 2006.

Background
He was owned by Earle I. Mack, United States Ambassador to Finland and a member of the board of directors of the New York Racing Association. Electrocutionist was trained in Italy by Valfredo Valiani before being bought by Godolphin Racing in November 2005. Based in Dubai during the winter months, in the spring of 2006 he was sent to Godolphin's stables in Newmarket, England.

Racing career
After winning the 2006 Dubai World Cup, Electrocutionist placed second to Ouija Board in the Prince of Wales's Stakes at Royal Ascot, and finished second again by a short margin to Hurricane Run in the King George VI and Queen Elizabeth Stakes, also at Ascot.

Sudden death
On September 9, 2006, Electrocutionist suffered an unexpected and fatal heart attack. Five days before his death, an abnormality was discovered in his heart, but it was deemed nothing to cause concern to his owners and trainer.

Godolphin's main trainer in Europe, Saeed bin Suroor, said: "He was a wonderful, brave horse, a real pleasure to train. He gave his best every time he ran and I will always remember the courage and class he showed in winning the Dubai World Cup. He was a champion."

Pedigree Online wrote of Electrocutionist moments after learning of his death: "A tremendously brave and talented horse. To perform as he did with such a condition, truly a champion. RIP."

Pedigree

External links
 Electrocutionist's pedigree, with winning photo
 NTRA bio

2001 racehorse births
2006 racehorse deaths
Racehorses bred in Kentucky
Racehorses trained in Italy
Racehorses trained in the United Kingdom
Dubai World Cup winners
Thoroughbred family 23